Pundravardhana or Pundra Kingdom, was an ancient kingdom of Bengal during the Iron Age period in India with a territory that included parts of present-day Rajshahi and Rangpur Divisions of Bangladesh as well as the West Dinajpur district of West Bengal, India. The capital of the kingdom, then known as Pundranagara (Pundra city), was located at Mahasthangarh in Bogra District in northern Bangladesh.

Geography
Mahasthangarh, the ancient capital of Pundravardhana is located 11 km (7 mi) north of Bogra on the Bogra-Rangpur highway, with a feeder road (running along the eastern side of the ramparts of the citadel for 1.5 km) leading to Jahajghata and site museum.

Mention in Mahabharata and puranic literature
According to the epic Mahabharata (I.104.53-54) and puranic literature, Pundra was named after Prince Pundra, the founder of the kingdom, and the son of King Bali. Bali who had no children, requested the sage, Dirghatamas, to bless him with sons. The sage is said to have begotten five sons through his wife, the queen Sudesna. The princes were named Anga, Vanga, Kalinga, Pundra and Sumha.

Ancient period

Birth place of Acharya Bhadrabāhu 
The spiritual teacher of Chandragupta Maurya, Jain Ācārya Bhadrabahu was born in Pundravardhana.

Execution of Ajivikas
According to Ashokavadana, the Mauryan emperor Ashoka issued an order to kill all the Ajivikas (follower of nāstika or "heterodox" schools of Indian philosophy) in Pundravardhana after a non-Buddhist there drew a picture showing the Gautama Buddha bowing at the feet of Nirgrantha Jnatiputra. Around 18,000 followers of the Ajivika sect were said to have been executed as a result of this order.

Discovery
Several personalities contributed to the discovery and identification of the ruins at Mahasthangarh. F. Buchanan Hamilton was the first European to locate and visit Mahasthangarh in 1808, C. J. O’Donnell, E. V. Westmacott, and Baveridge followed. Alexander Cunningham was the first to identify the place as the capital of Pundravardhana. He visited the site in 1889.

References

Historical Indian regions
Ancient divisions in Bengal